The Singapore–United States relations refers to the bilateral relations between the Republic of Singapore and the United States of America. According to the U.S. Global Leadership Report, 77% of Singaporeans approved of U.S. leadership under the Obama Administration in 2010, and while this approval rating decreased slightly down to 75% in 2011, it nonetheless remains one of the highest ratings of the U.S. for any surveyed country in the Asia-Pacific region.

Despite the close relationships between the two countries have however, on 1 April 2022, during Prime Minister Lee Hsien Loong's visit to the US, he emphasised that Singapore is not an ally of the United States, Singapore will not be involved in a war of the United States or ask the United States to come to the rescue when something happens to Singapore.

History
The United States first opened a consulate in Singapore in 1836, when the island was part of the Straits Settlements of the British Empire. Singapore and the United States have maintained formal diplomatic relations since the independence of Singapore in 1965. Singapore's efforts to maintain economic growth and political stability and its support for regional cooperation harmonize with U.S. policy in the region and form a solid basis for amicable relations between the two countries.

From 1965 to 1975, the United States offered significant economic assistance to stabilise Singapore as a key segment of their containment of communism during the Cold War, and Singapore's economy industrialised through providing repair and transshipment facilities for the American forces in Vietnam.

Hendrickson affair
E. Mason "Hank" Hendrickson was serving as First Secretary of the United States Embassy when he was expelled by the Singapore Government in May 1988. Prior to his expulsion, he arranged for Francis Seow and Patrick Seong to travel to Washington, D.C. to meet with American officials. After their return, Singapore detained them under the Internal Security Act. Based on Seow and Seong's statements while in custody, the Singapore Government alleged that Hendrickson attempted to interfere in Singapore's internal affairs by cultivating opposition figures in a "Marxist conspiracy". First Deputy Prime Minister Goh Chok Tong claimed that Hendrickson's alleged conspiracy could have resulted in the election of 20 or 30 opposition politicians to Parliament, which in his words could lead to "horrendous" effects, possibly even the paralysis and fall of the Singapore Government.

In the aftermath of Hendrickson's expulsion, the U.S. State Department praised his performance in Singapore and denied any impropriety in his actions. The State Department also expelled Robert Chua, a senior-level Singaporean diplomat equal in rank to Mason, from Washington, D.C. in response. The State Department's refusal to reprimand Hendrickson, along with their expulsion of the Singaporean diplomat, sparked a protest in Singapore by the National Trades Union Congress; they drove buses around the U.S. embassy, held a rally attended by four thousand workers, and issued a statement deriding the U.S. as "sneaky, arrogant, and untrustworthy".

A Heritage Foundation paper speculated that Singapore's angry public reaction to the Hendrickson affair may have been a response to the January 1988 termination of Singapore's eligibility for the Generalized System of Preferences, which provided tariff exemptions on Singaporean exports to the United States.

2018 North Korea–United States Summit

The latest meeting was held on 11 June 2018 between Prime Minister Lee Hsien Loong and President Donald Trump at the Istana before meeting North Korean leader Kim Jong Un the next day.

Fields of relations
During the 2015 ASEAN Summit, when US President Barack Obama met Singapore Prime Minister Lee Hsien Loong, Obama described the state of bilateral relations as being "very, very strong".

Free trade agreement

The United States and Singapore signed the Singapore–United States Free Trade Agreement on 6 May 2003; the agreement entered into force on 1 January 2004. The growth of U.S. investment in Singapore and the large number of Americans living there enhance opportunities for contact between Singapore and the United States. Singapore is a Visa Waiver Program country.

The Singapore Government denied speculation that the signing of the FTA was linked to Singapore's support of the Iraq War coalition shortly before the signing.

Military relations

Singapore has long standing military relations with the United States. The United States sells arms to Singapore and provides access to its bases to train the Singaporean military outside of their small island city-state. Under the U.S.–Singapore Strategic Framework Agreement, some U.S. Navy littoral combat ships are rotationally deployed to Singapore's Changi Naval Base. Air Force One also lands at Paya Lebar Air Base whenever the president visits the country. On September 23, 2019, Singapore Prime Minister Lee Hsien Loong and US President Donald Trump renewed a key defence pact which allows American forces to use Singapore's air and naval bases, extending it by another 15 years to 2035. On 1 April 2022, Prime Minister Lee Hsien Loong emphasised that Singapore is not an ally of the United States, Singapore will not be involved in a war of the United States or ask the United States to come to the rescue when something happens to Singapore.

Relief operations

 
Following that devastation of the United States Gulf Coast by Hurricane Katrina, three Singaporean CH-47 Chinook helicopters and 38 RSAF personnel from a training detachment based in Grand Prairie, Texas, assisted in relief operations from 1 September. They ferried about 700 evacuees and hauled tons of supplies in 39 sorties on 4 September. One more CH-47 Chinook helicopter was sent to aid in relief efforts.

Academic exchanges
In 2011, more than 4,300 Singaporeans were studying in the United States, the highest figure in 10 years. The number of Singaporean students studying in the United States grew by 7 percent since 2010. American universities with the most number of Singaporeans are among the most prestigious in the country which includes Harvard University, Cornell University, Stanford University, and University of California, Berkeley. To add to the rising number of college students study in the United States, many local students in Singapore have also opted to study in American high schools. US Ambassador to Singapore David I. Adelman said that the high number of Singaporeans studying in the United States reflects that Singapore–United States relations "have never been better".

In 2012, Singapore and the United States signed a Memorandum of Understanding (MOU) to enhance collaboration in education between the two countries. This is the second MOU between the United States and Singapore on education. The first MOU signed in 2002 primarily focused on the teaching and learning of the Singaporean method of mathematics and science. The 2012 MOU have enhanced the teaching of mathematics and science, teacher development and school leadership, and educational research and benchmarking studies. In addition, the conference also announced that the National Institute of Education (NIE) in Singapore and Columbia University's Teachers College are launching a joint Masters of Arts in Leadership and Educational Change. This joint Masters programme will take in up to 30 students from January 2013.

The U.S. government sponsors visitors from Singapore each year under the International Visitor Leadership Program (IVLP). The U.S. hovernment provides Fulbright Awards to enable selected American professors to teach or conduct research at the National University of Singapore and the Institute of Southeast Asian Studies. It awards scholarships to outstanding Singaporean students for graduate studies at American universities and to American students to study in Singapore. The U.S. government also sponsors occasional cultural presentations in Singapore. The East-West Center and private American organizations, such as the Asia Foundation and Ford Foundation, also sponsor exchanges involving Singaporeans.

Diplomatic representation

Singapore's chief diplomatic mission to the United States is the Singapore Embassy in Washington, D.C.. It is further supported by many consulates located through the United States. The Singapore Government maintains consulates-general in several major U.S. cities including: Chicago, Miami, Houston, New York City and San Francisco.

The current Singapore Ambassador to the United States is Ashok Mirpuri. Former United States Ambassador to Singapore, Steven J. Green, is Honorary Consul in Miami while the Former Chairman of the Federal Communications Commission, Newton N. Minow, is Honorary Consul in Chicago.

The United States first opened a consulate in Singapore 1836, which was then part of the British Straits Settlements, appointing Joseph Balestier to the post of consul. The American embassy in Singapore was established on 4 April 1966, under chargé d'affaires ad interim Richard H. Donald. Kirk Wagar most recently served as the U.S. Ambassador to Singapore from September 2013 to January 2017.

Former Deputy US National Security Adviser K. T. McFarland was reportedly offered the ambassadorship, but withdrew her nomination citing differences with the Trump administration. In September 2019, Trump nominated Barbera Hale Thornhill, president of Impact Design, a business-focused interior design firm in Los Angeles, California, as ambassador. She too was never confirmed and withdrawn by his successor Joe Biden in February 2021.

On 30 November 2021, Jonathan E. Kaplan was confirmed by the US Senate and sworn in as the US Ambassador to Singapore.

See also
Singaporean Americans
Foreign relations of the United States
Foreign relations of Singapore

Notes

References

Further reading

 Chua, Daniel Wei Boon, "Becoming a `Good Nixon Doctrine Country': Political Relations between the United States and Singapore during the Nixon Presidency," Australian Journal of Politics and History 60 (Dec. 2014), 534–48.

External links
Singapore – U.S. relations

 
Bilateral relations of the United States
United States